Ready for the Weekend is the second studio album by Scottish musician Calvin Harris, released on 14 August 2009 by Fly Eye and Columbia Records. The album debuted atop the UK Albums Chart and was certified gold by the British Phonographic Industry (BPI). It spawned the singles "I'm Not Alone", "Ready for the Weekend", "Flashback" and "You Used to Hold Me".

Background
Harris had been working on the album since the release of his debut album, I Created Disco, with the first tracks being recorded in 2008. In April 2008, Harris stated that the only existing copy of his then-upcoming album was lost when his laptop was misplaced during the baggage handling problems at the opening of London Heathrow Terminal 5. He later stated on the BBC's Glastonbury Festival 2008 coverage that he got his baggage back including the album within a few days. However, Harris ultimately admitted in April 2009 that this was a lie as the album was not in his luggage at all, and that he hoped that what he said would give him more time to finish recording the album.

"Yeah Yeah Yeah La La La" was used in a Coca-Cola advertisement in mid-2009.

Singles
"I'm Not Alone" was released as the album's lead single on 6 April 2009. The song debuted at number one on the UK Singles Chart, knocking off Lady Gaga's "Poker Face". It spent two weeks atop the chart, before dropping to number three in its third week. "Ready for the Weekend" was released as the album's second single on 9 August 2009. The song peaked at number three on the UK Singles Chart.

"Flashback" was released as the third single from the album on 2 November 2009. The track reached number 18 on the UK Singles Chart. The album's fourth and final single, "You Used to Hold Me", was released on 8 February 2010, peaking at number 27 on the UK chart. An extended version of Harris's 2008 chart-topping collaboration with Dizzee Rascal, "Dance wiv Me", is also included on the album.

Commercial performance
Ready for the Weekend debuted at number one on the UK Albums Chart, selling 36,308 copies in its first week. The album was certified gold by the British Phonographic Industry (BPI) on 16 October 2009, and by November 2014, it had sold 274,786 copies in the United Kingdom. The album was also successful in Ireland, where it peaked at number six on the Irish Albums Chart. In the United States, it reached number 12 on the Dance/Electronic Albums chart and number 22 on the Heatseekers Albums chart. Ready for the Weekend attained moderate success elsewhere, reaching number 39 in Australia, number 74 in Belgium (Wallonia) and number 139 in France.

Track listing

Personnel
Credits adapted from the liner notes of Ready for the Weekend.

 Calvin Harris – production, arrangement, vocals, instruments, design concept
 Snake Davis – saxophone 
 Mary Pearce – additional vocals 
 Ayah Marar – additional vocals 
 Izza Kizza – vocals 
 Mark Irving – guitar 
 Dizzee Rascal – vocals 
 Chrome – vocals 
 Brian "Big Bass" Gardner – mastering
 Matthew Shave – sleeve photography
 Spiros Politis – inside photography
 Steve Stacey – design

Charts

Weekly charts

Year-end charts

Certifications

Release history

References

2009 albums
Albums produced by Calvin Harris
Calvin Harris albums
Columbia Records albums
Ultra Records albums